Minos Volonakis (1925 or 1926, Athens – 15 November 1999, Athens) was a Greek theatre director and translator.

He studied with Karolos Koun, for whom he translated American plays into Greek, and first made his name for his translations of the dramas of his friend Jean Genet, as well as for productions of Samuel Beckett's Waiting for Godot and Aristophanes' Lysistrata at the Athens Festival. In protest against the government, he left Greece in 1966 for England, where he became an associate director at the Oxford Playhouse. His productions there included Genet's The Maids (1963-4) and The Balcony (1967), and Jean Giraudoux's Madwoman of Chaillot.

He provided the translation into English of Euripides' Iphigeneia at Aulis for a production at the Circle in the Square Theatre in New York in 1967, which Michael Cacoyannis directed. He directed a production of Euripides' The Bacchae at the Lyceum Theater in New York in 1968 and the US première of Genet's The Screens in 1971. In 1973 he directed Euripides' Medea at the Circle in the Square Theatre in New York, which opened on January 17.

From 1975 to 1978 he was the general manager of the Northern State Theater in Greece. In 1984 he directed a production of Sophocles' Oedipus Rex for the National Theatre of Greece, which subsequently transferred to the Vivian Beaumont Theater on Broadway (opening on July 17 of that year).

References

Sources
 Anonymous. 1999. Obituary in The New York Times, November 20, 1999. Available online.
 Chapman, Don. 2008. Oxford Playhouse: High and Low Drama in a University City. Hatfield: U of Hertfordshire P. .
 White, Edmund. 1993. Genet. Corrected edition. London: Picador, 1994. .

1999 deaths
Greek theatre directors
1920s births
People from Athens